Power in Numbers: The Rebel Women of Mathematics is a book on women in mathematics, by Talithia Williams. It was published in 2018 by Race Point Publishing.

Topics and related works
This book is a collection of biographies of 27 women mathematicians, and brief sketches of the lives of many others. It is similar to previous works including Osen's Women in Mathematics (1974), Perl's Math Equals (1978), Henrion's Women in Mathematics (1997), Murray's Women Becoming Mathematicians (2000), Complexities: Women in Mathematics (2005), Green and LaDuke's Pioneering Women in American Mathematics (2009), and Swaby's Headstrong (2015).

The book is divided into three sections. The first two cover mathematics before and after World War II, when women's mathematical contributions to codebreaking and other aspects of the war effort became crucial;
together they include the biographies of 11 mathematicians. The final section, on modern (post-1965) mathematics has another 16. Mathematics is interpreted in a broad sense, including people who trained as mathematicians and worked in industry, or who made mathematical contributions in other fields. It includes people from more diverse backgrounds than previous such collections, including 18th-century Chinese astronomer Wang Zhenyi, Native American engineer Mary G. Ross, African-American rocket scientist Annie Easley, Iranian mathematician Maryam Mirzakhani, and Mexican-American mathematician Pamela E. Harris.

Mathematicians
The mathematicians discussed in this book include:

Part I: The Pioneers

Marie Crous
Émilie du Châtelet
Maria Gaetana Agnesi
Philippa Fawcett
Isabel Maddison
Grace Chisholm Young
Wang Zhenyi
Sophie Germain
Winifred Edgerton Merrill
Sofya Kovalevskaya
Emmy Noether
Euphemia Haynes

Part II: From Code Breaking to Rocket Science

Grace Hopper
Mary G. Ross
Dorothy Vaughan
Katherine Johnson
Mary Jackson
Shakuntala Devi
Annie Easley
Margaret Hamilton

Part III: Modern Math Mavens

Sylvia Bozeman
Eugenia Cheng
Carla Cotwright-Williams
Pamela E. Harris
Maryam Mirzakhani
Ami Radunskaya
Daina Taimiņa
Tatiana Toro
Chelsea Walton
Sara Zahedi

Audience and reception
The book is aimed at a young audience, with many images and few mathematical details. Nevertheless, each biography is accompanied by a general-audience introduction to the subject's mathematical work, and beyond images of the women profiled, the book includes many mathematical illustrations and historical images that bring to life these contributions. Reviewer Emille Davie Lawrence suggests that the book could also find its way to the coffee tables of professional mathematicians, and spark conversations with guests.

Reviewer Amy Ackerberg-Hastings criticizes the book for overlooking much scholarly work on the subject of women in mathematics, for its lack of detail for some notable women including Émilie du Châtelet and Maria Gaetana Agnesi, and for omitting others such as Mary Somerville. Nevertheless, she recommends it as a "gift book for middle schoolers", as a way of motivating them to work in STEM fields.

Reviewer Allan Stenger notes with approval the book's inclusion of information about how each subject became interested in mathematics, and despite catching some minor errors calls it "a good bet for inspiring bright young women to have an interest in math". Similarly, reviewer L. Angela Mihai writes that it "will educate and encourage many aspiring mathematicians".

References

Women in mathematics
Biographies and autobiographies of mathematicians
2018 non-fiction books